Edward Jones (1807–1865) was an African American missionary to the colony of Sierra Leone. Jones was a prominent missionary and figure in the colony of Sierra Leone; he was the first naturalized citizen of Sierra Leone (though he retained his American citizenship). Jones was the first black principal of Fourah Bay College.  He was the first Black American to graduate from Amherst College in Massachusetts.  Edward Jones was the brother of Jehu Jones, a prominent African-American preacher.

Early life
Edward Jones was born in Charleston, South Carolina and became part of the mulatto elite of that majority African-American city. Many free mulattoes were freed slaves who had fought in the American Revolutionary War for the Patriots and then freed for their loyalty. Edward Jones's father, Jehu Jones, in 1798, had bought his freedom for $140 from his owner, a tailor who had taught him the craft, and also bought freedom for his wife Abigail and children. Jones Sr. became wealthy from his investments in real estate and eventually a hotel owner catering to white travelers. He bought his first slave in 1807. According to historian Bernard E. Powers, the senior Jones associated himself with elite white Charlestonians and "seldom kept the company of even light-complexioned free blacks and never of slaves." Nonetheless, Edward Jones was proud of his African heritage, and was a member of the Brown Fellowship Society in Charleston.

Immigration to Liberia
Jones immigrated to Liberia but did not stay long before immigrating to the colony of Freetown, Sierra Leone.

Life in Sierra Leone
It is in Sierra Leone that Jones is most remembered as a great leader and one of the patriarchs of a prominent Krio family.
Jones was a superintendent of the liberated African village of Kent, Sierra Leone and it was there he met one of the Nova Scotian settlers, Hannah Nylander, and married her. Jones had married into another prominent family; his wife was of half Nova Scotian (Black Loyalist descent, making her ultimately of Black American descent) and half German through her missionary father, Gustav Nylander.  In all Jones married three times and buried all of his wives in Sierra Leone.  Jones also fathered six children, only one whom lived to adulthood.  Jones was also the first principal of the newly established Fourah Bay College in Fourah Bay, Sierra Leone (a suburb of Freetown). It was there that the only known portrait of Edward Jones was hung on the wall. Jones died in England in 1865.

References

Sources
 
 "Edward Jones: An African American in Sierra Leone", in Moving On: Black Loyalists in the Afro-Atlantic World, by Nemata Blyden.

1807 births
1865 deaths
American Protestant missionaries
Protestant missionaries in Sierra Leone
African-American missionaries
Sierra Leone Creole people
Amherst College alumni
People from Charleston, South Carolina
Academic staff of Fourah Bay College
African-American college graduates before 1865